Fábio Fortes Moreira (born 8 March 1992) is a Portuguese professional footballer who plays as a forward for F.C. Penafiel.

Club career
Born in Lisbon, Fortes joined Sporting CP's academy at the age of 10. He finished his development at Real S.C. also in the capital's metropolitan area.

Fortes signed for Vitória S.C. in June 2011. He never represented the club officially, being loaned to C.D. Trofense and SC Mirandela and making his professional debut in the Segunda Liga with the former side.

After further third-division spells with Santa Maria FC, Lusitano FCV and Sport Benfica e Castelo Branco, Fortes returned to the second tier in June 2016, on a two-year contract at F.C. Penafiel. He scored 11 goals in his first season to help his team to the fifth place, adding eight in the second.

Fortes and F.C. Arouca were relegated to division three at the end of 2018–19. On 8 March 2020, he scored four times in a 9–0 home rout of Ginásio Figueirense; the campaign, shortened due to the COVID-19 pandemic, ended in immediate promotion.

On 17 August 2020, Fortes joined FC Hermannstadt of the Romanian Liga I. He played his first match in top-flight football one week later in a 1–1 away draw against FC Dinamo București, scoring his first goal in his next appearance as the hosts drew 2–2 with FC Academica Clinceni.

Fortes returned to Portugal in summer 2021, agreeing to a one-year deal with Académica de Coimbra.

Personal life
Fortes' younger brother, Carlos, was also a footballer and a forward.

References

External links

1992 births
Living people
Portuguese sportspeople of Cape Verdean descent
Black Portuguese sportspeople
Portuguese footballers
Footballers from Lisbon
Association football forwards
Liga Portugal 2 players
Segunda Divisão players
Real S.C. players
Vitória S.C. B players
C.D. Trofense players
SC Mirandela players
Santa Maria F.C. players
Lusitano FCV players
Sport Benfica e Castelo Branco players
F.C. Penafiel players
F.C. Arouca players
Associação Académica de Coimbra – O.A.F. players
Liga I players
FC Hermannstadt players
Portuguese expatriate footballers
Expatriate footballers in Romania
Portuguese expatriate sportspeople in Romania